Holy Cross Church of Mahlezan  is an Armenian Apostolic church in Mahlezan, Khoy County, West Azerbaijan Province, Iran.

References

See also 
 List of Armenian churches in Iran

Armenian Apostolic churches in Iran
Churches in Iran
Buildings and structures in West Azerbaijan Province
History of West Azerbaijan Province
Tourist attractions in West Azerbaijan Province